Dolphin Music was an online retailer selling a vast array of musical instruments and recording equipment online and is currently owned by S&T Audio.  It first began in Liverpool, England in 1999.

History
Robert Williams (11 September 1979 — 2 March 2009) and Jason Tavaria, while still at Liverpool University, used their credit cards & student loans to set up a company that would sell musical equipment by mail order and over the internet.

By 2008 the business had 80 staff and £16m in revenues. In 2009 Robert Williams Co-Founder died whilst snowboarding in Switzerland whilst with Co-Founder Jason Tavaria. In 2011 Dolphin Music was purchased by S&T Audio Ltd, who also own Professional Music Technology (PMT) retail stores and the PMTonline.co.uk webstore.

Legacy
A memorial fund has been established with the Prince's Trust with the aim of helping inspire others follow Rob's business success following a fatal accident while on holiday – with associates including Michelle Dewberry – snowboarding at Verbier. On 2 March 2009, he slipped 60 ft (20 metres) during treacherous skiing conditions. Jason was found alive via GPS tracking, but Rob was dead by 11pm. The news broke of the plight of the missing adventurers on the Swiss Alps via mobile telephone updates to microblog networking service Twitter.
 The celebration of Mr Williams's life was marked by his funeral and a reception at St Albans Cathedral and Sopwell House respectively on 19 March.

References

External links
 Official site and Web Store
 The Rob Williams Enterprise Fund
 ST Audio buys Dolphin

Online retailers of the United Kingdom